Structured English is the use of the English language with the syntax of structured programming to communicate the design of a computer program to non-technical users by breaking it down into logical steps using straightforward English words. Structured English gives aims to get the benefits of both the programming logic and natural language: program logic helps to attain precision, whilst natural language helps with the familiarity of the spoken word.

It is the basis of some programming languages such as SQL (Structured Query Language) "for use by people who have need for interaction with a large database but who are not trained programmers".

Elements 
Advanced English Structure is a limited-form "pseudocode" and consists of the following elements:
Operation statements written as English phrases executed from the top down
Conditional blocks indicated by keywords such as IF, THEN, and ELSE
Repetition blocks indicated by keywords such as DO, WHILE, and UNTIL

The following guidelines are used when writing Structured English:
All logic should be expressed in operational, conditional, and repetition blocks
Statements should be clear and unambiguous
Logical blocks should be indented to show relationship and hierarchy
Use one line per logical element, or indent the continuation line
Keywords should be capitalized
Group blocks of statements together, with a capitalized name that describes their function and end with an EXIT.
Underline words or phrases defined in a data dictionary pronunciation definition and meaning.
Mark comment lines with an asterisk

Example of Structured English 
APPROVE LOAN
 IF customer has a Bank Account THEN
    IF Customer has no dues from previous account THEN
       Allow loan facility
    ELSE
       IF Management Approval is obtained THEN
          Allow loan facility
       ELSE
         Reject
       ENDIF
    ENDIF
 ELSE
    Reject
 ENDIF
 EXIT

Criticism
Though useful for planning programs, modules and routines, or describing algorithms it is less useful when numerous decisions need to be made.

Other specification tools 
System processes at a lower level involve lot of computations and require more precision and clarity. This can be achieved with tools such as decision trees or decision tables.

See also
Natural language programming
Self-documenting code
Structured programming
Pseudocode
Decision tree
Decision table
Attempto Controlled English

References

 
Algorithm description languages